Penpergwm is a village in south Wales, situated along the A40 road,  south-east of Abergavenny and  west of Monmouth. The site of Castell Arnallt lies on a mound in the water meadows between the village and the River Usk.

The village used to have to a railway station on the Welsh Marches Line, but it closed in 1958. The former station house is now a private residence.

The former British politician Francis Pym was born in Penpergwm Lodge in the village.

References

Villages in Monmouthshire